Nina Yakovlevna Dumbadze (23 May 1919 – 14 April 1983) was a discus thrower who represented the Soviet Union. She won the European title in 1946 and 1950, and a bronze medal at the 1952 Olympics.

Dumbadze was born in Odessa to a Georgian father. She later moved to Tbilisi, Georgia, where she started training in athletics in 1937. Two years later at the Soviet championships she threw 49.11 m and broke the Gisela Mauermayer's world record of 48.31 m. Dumbadze kept breaking world records during World War II, and a week after the 1946 European Championships threw 50.50 m in Sarpsborg, Norway. In August 1948, she threw 53.25 m in Moscow. She set two more ratified world records: in May 1951 in Gori (53.37 m), and in October 1952 in Tbilisi (57.04 m). By that time she had a strong competition from teammates Nina Romashkova and Yelizaveta Bagryantseva, and hence placed third at the 1952 Olympics. Earlier she won eight Soviet titles, in 1939, 1943–44 and 1946–50.

After retiring from competitions Dumbadze worked as an athletics coach together with her husband Boris Dyachkov, who trained the Georgian athletics team for almost five decades. Their son Yuri Dyachkov became an Olympic decathlete.

Notes

References

External links
 Biography 

1919 births
1983 deaths
Sportspeople from Odesa
People from Odessky Uyezd
Ukrainian people of Georgian descent
Soviet female discus throwers
Female discus throwers from Georgia (country)
Olympic athletes of the Soviet Union
Olympic bronze medalists for the Soviet Union
Athletes (track and field) at the 1952 Summer Olympics
European Athletics Championships medalists
World record setters in athletics (track and field)
Dynamo sports society athletes
Medalists at the 1952 Summer Olympics
Olympic bronze medalists in athletics (track and field)